The Office of Sanctions Coordination is a division within the United States Department of State tasked with coordinating sanctions policies between government departments and international allies. It was established by the 2021 Consolidated Appropriations Act. The office had previously existed from 2013 to 2017, after which it was eliminated by then-Secretary of State Rex Tillerson. The office is managed by the Head of the Office of Sanctions Coordination, a position with the rank of ambassador.

Officeholders

References

2013 establishments in the United States
United States Department of State agencies
United States sanctions
Presidency of Barack Obama